Loray is an extinct town in Elko County in Nevada. The GNIS classifies it as a populated place.

History
Loray once was the shipping point of timber extracted from nearby mountainous forests. In 1941, Loray had 11 inhabitants.

See also

 List of ghost towns in Nevada

References

External links

Ghost towns in Elko County, Nevada